Gignac is a commune in the Lot department in south-western France. Gignac-Cressensac station has rail connections to Brive-la-Gaillarde, Cahors and Toulouse.

See also
Communes of the Lot department

References

Gallery

Communes of Lot (department)